The 2017 Mountain West Conference men's basketball tournament will take place from March 8–11, 2017 at the Thomas & Mack Center in Las Vegas, Nevada. The winner, Nevada, receives the conference's automatic bid to the 2017 NCAA tournament with a 79-71 win over Colorado State.

Seeds
All 11 conference teams participate in the tournament. The top five seeds receive first round byes.

Teams will be seeded by record within the conference, with a tiebreaker system to seed teams with identical conference records.

Schedule

Bracket

* denotes overtime period

References

Mountain West Conference men's basketball tournament
Tournament
Mountain West Conference men's basketball tournament
Mountain West Conference men's basketball tournament
Basketball competitions in the Las Vegas Valley
College basketball tournaments in Nevada
21st century in Las Vegas
College sports tournaments in Nevada